Anne Flett-Giordano (née Flett; born 1965) is an American television producer and screenwriter, known for her work on Kate & Allie, Frasier, Desperate Housewives, Hot in Cleveland and Mom.

On Hot in Cleveland, the fictional medical condition "Flett-Giordano Syndrome" was named after her.

She is also the author of the murder mystery / social satire “Marry, Kiss, Kill”

References

External links
 

American television producers
American women television producers
American television writers
Emmy Award winners
Living people
Place of birth missing (living people)
American women television writers
1965 births
21st-century American women